Alexandru Adrian Popovici (born 6 September 1988) is a Romanian professional footballer who plays as a winger for CSM Slatina.

Club career

Early career
Popovici began his youth career at Politehnica Timișoara. He was loaned three times to gain experience in Liga II to FCM Reșița where he played very well and was recalled to first team. However, he was loaned again at that time to the feeder club CS Buftea but in winter of 2009, he was loaned out again in Liga I to Gloria Buzău.

Politehnica Timișoara 
Popovici made his debut in the Romanian Liga I in 2007, against the rivals from Dinamo București. On 13 November 2010, Popovici scored his first goal for Politehnica Timișoara in the away match against the champions Unirea Urziceni. He opened the score in the 55th minute with a solo run.

Honours
Politehnica Timișoara
Liga II: 2011–12

ACS Poli Timișoara
Liga II: 2014–15

CSM Slatina
Liga III: 2021–22

References

External links
 
 

1988 births
Living people
Sportspeople from Timișoara
Romanian footballers
Association football midfielders
Romanian people of Serbian descent
Liga I players
Liga II players
Azerbaijan Premier League players
FC CFR Timișoara players
FC Politehnica Timișoara players
CSM Reșița players
LPS HD Clinceni players
FC Gloria Buzău players
CS Concordia Chiajna players
ACS Poli Timișoara players
FC Ripensia Timișoara players
CSM Slatina footballers
Sabail FK players
Romanian expatriate footballers
Expatriate footballers in Azerbaijan
Romanian expatriate sportspeople in Azerbaijan